Patrick Thompson (born 1935) was a British Conservative Party politician. Patrick Thompson may also refer to:

Patrick Thompson (artist) (fl. 2010s), Canadian artist
Patrick Daley Thompson (born 1969), alderman in Chicago

See also
Patrick Thomson, a department store in Edinburgh